Bhola In Bollywood is a Hindi multistarrer comedy-drama film of Bollywood directed and produced by Sumbul Gazi. This film was released on 15 October 2004 under the banner of Pedhiwala Entertainer. The film was a box office failure.

Plot
Bhola Prasad is a simple and honest young man who lives in a village of Bihar. One day he goes to his maternal uncle in Mumbai for a better future. Upon arrival in the city, all his belongings are stolen, he becomes helpless, but finds his uncle finally. He realises that his uncle is also in a needy situation, searching for a job. Bhola decides to enter into Bollywood to become a film hero. After a few days, Bhola and his uncle learn that it is not an easy task to be a hero in the Bollywood film industry. He meets Raveena, a young lady from America who aspires to become a Bollywood star. The film ends when they become stars for the same movie after a failed romance.

Cast

 Raj Babbar
 Shammi Kapoor
 Vinod Khanna
 Raza Murad as Instructor
 Siraj Khan as Bhola
 Razak Khan as Photographer 
 Virendra Saxena as Bhola's uncle
 Bharati Sharma as Ravina
Imran Khan
 Suresh Chatwal 
 Avtar Gill as Mohan, Producer
 Alok Nath as Mehra
 Ali Asgar
 Rajesh Puri
 Ajit Vachani

References

External links
 
 Bhola in Bollywood in rottentomatoes

2004 films
2004 comedy-drama films
Indian comedy-drama films
2000s Hindi-language films
Films about Bollywood
2004 comedy films
2004 drama films